Kapoeta  is a town in South Sudan. It is located in Kapoeta South County, in Eastern Equatoria State, in southeastern South Sudan.

Location

The town lies on the east bank of the Singaita River. The post at Kapoeta was established by Captain Knollys, who reached the river in January 1927.

History
Kapoeta was upgraded to Town status administered by a town clerk on August 19, 2013.

Transport
The main road from Lokichogio, Kenya to the capital city of Juba, South Sudan, runs through Kapoeta. The town is also served by Kapoeta Airport which, in 2011, was little more than a dirt strip.

Population
, the population of Kapoeta was estimated at about 7,000.

Culture
Kapoeta town sits in a land dominated by the Toposa ethnic group.  The Didinga also live in the area, but they are farmers and tend to inhabit the fertile, wetter hills, whereas the cattle-centric Toposa people dominate the plains.

In Popular Culture
Kapoeta is a destination for the many South Sudanese who are chronicled in the nonfiction book "Lost Boy, Lost Girl: Escaping Civil War in Sudan."

Points of interest
The following points of interest are found in or near Kapoeta:
 The offices of Kapoeta Town Council
 The headquarters of Kapoeta South County
 Kapoeta Airport - a civilian airport to the north of town
 Kapoeta Power Station - A 0.9MW high-speed diesel plant, commissioned in 2011
 The Narus River - Seasonal river, prone to flooding

See also
 Kapoeta Airport
 Eastern Equatoria
 Equatoria

References

Populated places in Eastern Equatoria
Equatoria